Alexander Henningsson (born 14 May 1990) is a Swedish footballer who plays for Räppe GoIF.

References

External links 
 Alexander Henningsson at SvFF (in Swedish) (archived)

Swedish footballers
Allsvenskan players
Superettan players
Norwegian First Division players
Ettan Fotboll players
1990 births
Living people
Halmstads BK players
Östers IF players
IFK Värnamo players
Norrby IF players
Association football midfielders
People from Växjö
Sportspeople from Kronoberg County